Events from the year 1551 in France

Incumbents
 Monarch – Henry II

Events
 27 June – Edict of Châteaubriant prohibits possessing any books listed on the University of Paris's Index, translating the Bible or works of the Church Fathers, importing books from Geneva or other places not under the Catholic Church's control, or printing or selling any religious books written in the last 40 years.

Births 
 19 September – King Henry III of France (d. 1589)
 26 October – Charlotte de Sauve, courtesan (d. 1617)

Deaths
 Jean Ango, privateer (b. 1480)

See also

References

1550s in France